The 2004 German motorcycle Grand Prix was the eighth round of the 2004 MotoGP Championship. It took place on the weekend of 16–18 July 2004 at the Sachsenring.

MotoGP classification

250 cc classification

125 cc classification

Championship standings after the race (motoGP)

Below are the standings for the top five riders and constructors after round eight has concluded.

Riders' Championship standings

Constructors' Championship standings

 Note: Only the top five positions are included for both sets of standings.

References

German motorcycle Grand Prix
German
Motorcycle Grand Prix